Atera is a restaurant in the Tribeca neighborhood of New York City. 


History
Atera replaced the restaurant Compose, which closed after chef Nick Curtin departed. The owner, Jodi Richard, overhauled the restaurant's kitchen facilities to attract Matthew Lightner, a chef at Castagna in Portland, Oregon, so that he would develop a new concept to replace Compose. Enhancements to the space included the installation of a large test kitchen in the restaurant's basement. Compose officially closed in July 2011. Atera opened in March 2012, serving a $150 tasting menu with optional wine pairings for an additional $90.

Lightner left Atera in 2015. Richard hired Ronny Emborg to replace him. After Lightner's departure, the restaurant closed for several months. It was reopened in May 2015 with a new menu designed by Emborg.

Farm.One, a hydroponic produce company, began using the restaurant's basement space as a farm beginning in 2017. The restaurant occasionally provided some patrons tours of the farm facilities. In 2020, during the COVID-19 pandemic, the restaurant offered takeout through delivery service Caviar.

Reviews and accolades

Reviews
In a 2012 review of the restaurant, during Lightner's tenure, New York Times critic Pete Wells was mostly positive.

Accolades
The restaurant received two Michelin stars in 2012, its first rating by Michelin. The restaurant has maintained its two-star rating since 2012.

Recipient of the AAA Five-Star Award (2018-2022)

See also
List of Michelin starred restaurants in New York City

References

External links
 

2012 establishments in New York City
Michelin Guide starred restaurants in New York (state)
Restaurants in Manhattan
Tribeca
Restaurants established in 2012